Stadt Hecklingen was a Verwaltungsgemeinschaft ("collective municipality") in the Salzlandkreis district, in Saxony-Anhalt, Germany. The seat of the Verwaltungsgemeinschaft was in Hecklingen. It was disbanded on 1 January 2010.

The Verwaltungsgemeinschaft Stadt Hecklingen consisted of the following municipalities:

 Giersleben 
 Hecklingen

References

Former Verwaltungsgemeinschaften in Saxony-Anhalt